Enrique Torres Delgado (born 6 February 1959) is a Mexican politician from the National Action Party. From 2009 to 2012 he served as Deputy of the LXI Legislature of the Mexican Congress representing Sonora, having previously served in the LVI Legislature of the Congress of Sonora.

References

1959 births
Living people
Politicians from Sonora
National Action Party (Mexico) politicians
21st-century Mexican politicians
People from Magdalena de Kino
Members of the Congress of Sonora
Deputies of the LXI Legislature of Mexico
Members of the Chamber of Deputies (Mexico) for Sonora